The Hong Kong Olympic Football Team (also known as Hong Kong under-23 or Hong Kong U-23) represents Hong Kong in international football competitions in the Olympic Games, the Asian Games, the East Asian Games, as well as any other under-23 international football tournaments. It is committed by the Hong Kong Football Association.

Competition history
Denotes draws includes knockout matches decided on penalty kicks.

Olympic Games record
Before 1992, see Hong Kong national football team

AFC U-23 Asian Cup

Asian Games record

Before 2002, see Hong Kong national football team

† Excluding 1998 backwards

East Asian Games record

Schedule and results

2023
2023 Merlion Cup (24–26 March)

2024 AFC U-23 Asian Cup qualification (4–12 September)

2022 Asian Games (September)

Coaching staff

Current squad
The following 23 players have been called up for the final squad for 2023 Merlion Cup held in Singapore from 24 to 26 March 2023 in preparation for the upcoming 2024 AFC U-23 Asian Cup qualifiers held in September 2023. 
 Head coach:  Szeto Man Chun

Recent call-ups 
The following players have been called up for the team within the previous 12 months.

PRE

PRE
PRE
PRE
PRE

PRE
PRE
PRE
PRE

PRE
PRE
PRE
PRE

INJ Player withdrew from the squad due to an injury
PRE Preliminary squad
WD  Player withdrawn from the squad.
RET Player retired from international football

See also
Hong Kong national football team
Hong Kong national under-20 football team
Hong Kong national under-17 football team
Hong Kong Football Association
Football in Hong Kong
Sport in Hong Kong
Hong Kong

References

External links
 HKFA.com
 HKFA.com 香港代表隊近20年奧運預賽成績 (in Chinese)

Under-23
Asian national under-23 association football teams